From a Night Porter's Point of View is a 1977 documentary film by Polish filmmaker Krzysztof Kieślowski. It won the Grand Prix at the nineteenth Kraków Film Festival in 1979. The 17-minute film consists of an interview with Marian Osuch, a minor security official.

Most of the footage is of Osuch performing the various duties of his job, while he narrates his opinions on various subjects. Osuch talks mostly about his position, how he personally enjoys enforcing various bureaucratic rules, arresting petty offenders, and confiscating fishing rods. He also details his support for the government and capital punishment, saying that criticism of the government should be silenced, and that criminals should be hanged in public.

English-subtitled versions of the film are included on Polskie Wydawnictwo Audiowizualne's double-disc survey of Kieślowski's non-fiction work Polish School of the Documentary: Krzysztof Kieślowski (Region 0 PAL) and as an extra on the Artificial Eye DVD of Kieślowski's A Short Film About Killing (Region 2 PAL).

A sequel to the film titled Views of a Retired Night Porter, starring the same night porter, Marian Osuch, was directed by Andreas Horvath in 2006.

References

External links

Films directed by Krzysztof Kieślowski
1977 films
Polish short documentary films
1970s short documentary films
1977 documentary films
Documentary films about Poland
1970s Polish-language films